The Wofford Terriers women's basketball team represents Wofford College in Spartanburg, South Carolina, United States, in Division I of the NCAA. The school's team competes in the Southern Conference.

History
Wofford began play in 1981. They have played in the Southern Conference since 1995 after two years of transition to Division I. As of the end of the 2015–16 season, the Terriers have an all-time record of 354–633. They have never reached the NCAA Tournament nor the WNIT.

References

External links
 

Women